Alexis 133 is an Indian reserve of the Alexis Nakota Sioux Nation in Alberta, located within Lac Ste. Anne County. It is 70 kilometres northwest of Edmonton. In the 2016 Canadian Census, it recorded a population of 755 living in 173 of its 209 total private dwellings.

The reserve has the name of Alexis, a tribal leader.

References

Indian reserves in Alberta
Nakoda (Stoney)